The Crystal Skull is a 1996 video game from Maxis. The Shaman in the game is played by Edward James Olmos.

Reception

Computer Gaming World in their review stated that while pretty to look at, the game offers little of substance besides the culture notes.

References

1996 video games
Maxis games
Adventure games